Charles Herrick Compton (October 24, 1880 – March 17, 1966) was an American librarian and educator. Compton earned a degree from the University of Nebraska in 1901 and then attended the New York State library School from 1905 to 1908. He worked for the Seattle Public Library from 1910 to 1917 and left to work for the American Library Association during the first world war, buying books for the Library War Service. After the war, Compton went to work as an Assistant librarian for the St. Louis Public Library where he became Director in 1938. He retired from the St. Louis Public Library in 1950.

Compton served as president of the American Library Association from 1934 to 1935.

Publications
 The St. Louis public library today and tomorrow; a survey (1939)
 My European trip and the International Library Congress, April 25, 1935 to June 2, 1935 (1962)

References

 

1880 births
1966 deaths
Presidents of the American Library Association
American librarians